Twin Groves is a town in northwestern Faulkner County, Arkansas, United States. The name of the town comes from two neighboring communities — Solomon Grove and Zion Grove — which joined to incorporate as a town in 1991. The town's population was 335 at the 2010 census, up from 276 at the 2000 census. Twin Groves is part of the Little Rock–North Little Rock–Conway Metropolitan Statistical Area.

Geography
Twin Groves is located at  (35.316718, -92.424120). U.S. Route 65 passes through the eastern (Zion Grove) side of the town, leading south  to Conway, the county seat, and north  to Clinton.

Demographics

As of the census of 2000, there were 276 people, 103 households, and 74 families residing in the town.  The population density was 22.7/km (58.8/mi2).  There were 113 housing units at an average density of 9.3/km (24.1/mi2).  The racial makeup of the town was 26.81% White, 72.10% Black or African American, and 1.09% from two or more races.  0.36% of the population were Hispanic or Latino of any race.

There were 103 households, out of which 27.2% had children under the age of 18 living with them, 58.3% were married couples living together, 9.7% had a female householder with no husband present, and 27.2% were non-families. 25.2% of all households were made up of individuals, and 7.8% had someone living alone who was 65 years of age or older.  The average household size was 2.68 and the average family size was 3.21.

In the town, the population was spread out, with 22.5% under the age of 18, 8.0% from 18 to 24, 24.6% from 25 to 44, 27.5% from 45 to 64, and 17.4% who were 65 years of age or older.  The median age was 41 years. For every 100 females, there were 107.5 males.  For every 100 females age 18 and over, there were 103.8 males.

The median income for a household in the town was $34,375, and the median income for a family was $37,222. Males had a median income of $28,929 versus $16,250 for females. The per capita income for the town was $16,811.  None of the families and 3.3% of the population were living below the poverty line, including no under eighteens and 8.5% of those over 64.

Education 
Public education for elementary and secondary school students is available from the Guy–Perkins School District, which covers the vast majority of the area. From 1879 until consolidation with Guy-Perkins in 1949, Solomon Grove operated a separate school district including three black schools, whose students then attended classes in Conway until integration of Guy-Perkins High School in 1964 and Guy-Perkins Elementary School in 1966.

Small sections extend into the South Side School District and the Greenbrier School District.

References

Towns in Faulkner County, Arkansas
Towns in Arkansas
Little Rock–North Little Rock–Conway metropolitan area